Aurora, officially the Municipality of Aurora (Subanen: Benwa Aurora; Chavacano: Municipalidad de Aurora), is a 2nd class municipality in the province of Zamboanga del Sur, Philippines. According to the 2020 census, it has a population of 52,995 people.

The town was named after President Manuel Quezon's wife, Aurora Quezon.

In 1948, a portion of Aurora was separated to form the town of Molave.

Geography
It is the easternmost municipality in Zamboanga del Sur, bounded by the Province of Lanao del Norte on its eastern side.

Barangays
Aurora is politically subdivided into 44 barangays.

Climate

Demographics

Economy

References

External links
 Aurora Profile at PhilAtlas.com
 [ Philippine Standard Geographic Code]
Philippine Census Information

Municipalities of Zamboanga del Sur